Ocean Village may refer to:

Places
Ocean Village, Southampton, an area of Southampton, United Kingdom
Ocean Village, Gibraltar, an area of Gibraltar
Ocean Village Marina, Gibraltar, a marina in Gibraltar

Other
Ocean Village (company), a defunct cruise liner company based in Southampton, United Kingdom
Ocean Village, a former name of the cruise ship MV Pacific Pearl
Ocean Village Two, a former name of the cruise ship Pacific Jewel